Amin August Jr. (born August 16, 1990) is a Belizean professional forward currently playing for Santa Elena.

External links
 

1990 births
Living people
Belize international footballers
Belizean footballers
2011 Copa Centroamericana players
Association football forwards
Police United FC (Belize) players
Verdes FC players